Strong Island was an island in River Raisin, near Lake Erie, in Monroe County, Michigan.

See also
Sisters Island (Michigan)
Sterling Island

References

Islands of Monroe County, Michigan